Zvonimir Serdarušić (born 2 September 1950) is a Croatian former professional handball coach and player who competed in the 1976 Summer Olympics for Yugoslavia. In May 1998, he also acquired German citizenship.

Career

Yugoslavia
Serdarušić began his handball career in RK Velež from Mostar. After three seasons he moved to  
RK Bosna Sarajevo. In two seasons with Bosna Sarajevo he moved up from the third league to the first. In 1973 Serdarušić moved to Partizan Bjelovar. He stayed at the club for seven years winning the First League twice in 1977 and 1979, and the Cup once in 1977.

Germany
In 1981 he spent one season with THW Kiel before moving to Füchse Berlin Reinickendorf HBC, where he got to the semifinal of the IHF Cup in 1983, and the final of the DHB-Pokal in 1984 before retiring.

He also played a match for the world all star team.

Appearances and goals
THW Kiel (1980–1981): 26 (99)
Füchse Berlin Reinickendorf HBC (1981–1984): 73 (182)

International career
Seradušić first appeared at the 1974 World Championship in East Germany. There Yugoslavia won the bronze medal defeating Poland by a scoreline of 18–16.

He was part of the Yugoslav team which finished fifth in the 1976 Summer Olympic Games tournament. He played all six matches and scored 17 goals. Currently, Serdarušić is considered one of the top handball coaches in the world. He also played at the 1975 Mediterranean Games where he won a gold medal. His last tournament for the national team was at the 1978 World Championship where Yugoslavia finished in fifth place.

Controversy
Serdarušić was charged with allegedly having bribed referees in ten championship matches in 2010, while at THW Kiel. However, he was officially cleared in 2012.

Honours

Player
Bosna Sarajevo
Yugoslav Second League: 1971–72
Yugoslav Third League: 1970–71

Partizan Bjelovar
Yugoslav First League: 1976–77, 1978–79
Yugoslav Cup: 1976–77

Füchse Berlin
DHB-Pokal finalist: 1984

Coach
Velež Mostar
Yugoslav Third League: 1984–85

Bad Schwartau
2nd Bundesliga - North: 1989–90

Flensburg-Handewitt
2nd Bundesliga - North: 1991–92

THW Kiel
Bundesliga: 1993–94, 1994–95, 1995–96, 1997–98, 1998–99, 1999–00, 2001–02, 2004–05, 2005–06, 2006–07, 2007–08
DHB-Pokal: 1998, 1999, 2000, 2007, 2008
German Super Cup: 1995, 1998, 2005, 2007, 2008
EHF Champions League: 2006–07
EHF Champions Trophy: 2007
EHF Cup: 1998, 2002, 2004

Celje
Slovenian First League: 2009–10
Slovenian Cup: 2010
Slovenian Super Cup: 2010

Paris Saint-Germain
LNH Division 1: 2015–16, 2016–17
Coupe de France: 2018
Coupe de la Ligue: 2017, 2018
Trophée des champions: 2016

Individual
Best coach of Bundesliga: 2006, 2007, 2008
Coach of the Year in Germany: 1996, 1999, 2005, 2006, 2007

References

External links
 Profile 

1950 births
Living people
Croats of Bosnia and Herzegovina
German people of Croatian descent
German people of Bosnia and Herzegovina descent
Yugoslav male handball players
Croatian handball coaches
German handball coaches
THW Kiel players
Füchse Berlin Reinickendorf HBC players
Olympic handball players of Yugoslavia
Handball players at the 1976 Summer Olympics
Sportspeople from Mostar
Mediterranean Games medalists in handball
Mediterranean Games gold medalists for Yugoslavia
Competitors at the 1975 Mediterranean Games